Dynamo is a fictional superhero that appeared in comic books published by Fox Feature Syndicate. He originally appeared in Science Comics #1 (February 1940) under the name Electro. He appeared for the first time as Dynamo in Science Comics #2 (March 1940). The character's name was probably changed to avoid conflict with an earlier character from Timely Comics with the same name.

Fictional character biography
Jim Andrews is a young research scientist who is caught between two giant electrodes while conducting an experiment. He finds that the accident has given him the power to control electricity, which he can use to create force fields, shoot bolts of electricity from his hands, or fly through the air. If he uses his powers for too long, he can recharge by holding onto an electrical source. Deciding to call himself Electro, Jim puts on a helmet and cape to fight crime. He later changes his name to Dynamo, which he uses for the rest of his career.

According to Jess Nevins' Encyclopedia of Golden Age Superheroes, Dynamo "fights the Genius, Stark's Super Science Spies, saboteurs, the Invention Destroyers, and the Crime Dealers".

Dynamo was a regular feature in Fox's Science Comics and Weird Comics, occasionally as the lead feature. His last appearance was in Weird Comics #19 (November 1941).

Powers and abilities
Dynamo/Electro has the ability to control electricity. He can send electricity out from his hands, create bullet-repelling force fields, and fly. His source of electricity can be depleted by overuse, but he is able to recharge by holding onto a new source of electricity.

References

External links
 Dynamo at the Golden Age Heroes Directory
 Background on Dynamo and other Fox Feature characters at Comicartville Library

Fox Feature Syndicate superheroes
Golden Age superheroes
Comics characters introduced in 1940